Alessandro Gramigni (born 29 December 1968) is an Italian former professional motorcycle racer.
Gramigni is notable for winning the 1992 F.I.M. 125cc world championship.

Career
Gramigni was born in Florence, Italy. After a succession of good results as an amateur, he made his Grand Prix debut in 1990 riding an Aprilia in the 125cc Class, ending the season in ninth position. He won his first race at the 1991 Czechoslovakian Grand Prix and finished the season ranked seventh in the championship with 90 points. His victory in Czechoslovakia also marked the first Grand Prix victory in world championship competition for the Aprilia factory.

In 1992, he edged out Italian Fausto Gresini to win the 125cc world championship, with wins in Malaysia and Hungary. Gramigni moved up to the 250cc class in next season, first with the Gilera team before switching back to Aprilia. It was a disappointing season, as he scored only 2 points. He competed two more seasons in the 250 class, 1994 with the Aprilia, and in 1995 with Honda. After a two-year sabbatical, he entered one race in the 500cc class at the 1997 Malaysian Grand Prix before ending his Grand Prix career.

In 2004 he won the Italian Superbike Championship with the Yamaha Team 391 Racing team.

Career statistics

Grand Prix motorcycle racing

Races by year
(key) (Races in bold indicate pole position, races in italics indicate fastest lap)

Superbike World Championship

Races by year
(key) (Races in bold indicate pole position) (Races in italics indicate fastest lap)

References 

1968 births
Living people
Italian motorcycle racers
500cc World Championship riders
250cc World Championship riders
125cc World Championship riders
Superbike World Championship riders
Sportspeople from Florence
125cc World Riders' Champions